The peinirli (or penirli) is an elongated, open pie made in a boat shape. They contain a substantial amount of yellow cheese and, optionally, meats or vegetables. Peinirli originated in Turkey, where it is known as peynirli. There are two types of pide: peynirli pide, in which cheese entirely covers the surface of the filling, and karışık pide, which has cheese only as part of the filling (usually one third).

Etymology 
"Peinirli", meaning with cheese, comes from the Turkish roots peynir ("cheese") + -li ("with"). The suffix -li is also used for ingredients, such as kıymalı ("with minced meat"), pastırmalı ("with pastirma"), or ıspanaklı ("with spinach").

See also
Khachapuri
Burek
Banitsa
Pastrmalija
İçli Pide
Tiropita

References 

Turkish cuisine
Turkish pastries
Greek cuisine
Greek pastries
Pastries